The Abazin, Abazinians or Abaza (Abaza and Abkhaz: Абаза; Circassian: Абазэхэр; ;), are an ethnic group of the Northwest Caucasus, closely related to the Abkhaz and Circassian people. Now, they live mostly in Turkey, Syria, Lebanon, Jordan, Egypt and in Karachay-Cherkessia and Stavropol Krai in the North Caucasus region of Russia. The Tapanta (:ru:Тапанта), a branch of the Abaza, lived between the Besleney and Kabardian princedoms on the upper Kuban.

Abaza people historically speak the Abaza language, a Northwest Caucasian language closely related to Abkhaz and Circassian. There are two dialects of Abaza spoken in Karachay-Cherkessia: Ashkharua and Tapanta. The culture and traditions of the Abazin are similar to those of the Circassians. On many old maps Abazin territory is marked as part of Circassia (Adygea).

According to the 2010 Russian census, there were 43,341 Abazins in Russia.

History 
The Abazin originally inhabited the Sadzen region in the western part of Abkhazia and migrated from Abkhazia to Abazinia between the 14th and 16th centuries. They later migrated to various regions of the former Ottoman Empire in the 18th and 19th centuries. Since the late 18th century, their dominant religion is Sunni Islam (Hanafi).

Diaspora 
An Abazin diaspora exists in Turkey, Egypt and in Middle Eastern countries such as Jordan and Syria, most of which are descendants of muhajirs from the Caucasian War with the Russian Empire.

There is a significant Abazin presence in Turkey. An estimated 150,000 Abaza live in the provinces of Eskişehir, Samsun, Yozgat, Adana and Kayseri. 
Province Sakarya and İzmit and İstanbul 

Most of them belong to Ashkharua clan that fought against the Tsarist army and emigrated to Turkey after losing the battle of Kbaada (Krasnaya Polyana in today's Sochi), whereas the Tapanta clan fought with the Russian forces.

A prominent example in Egypt is the Abaza family, a large Egyptian Abazin clan.
The Abaza family still holds to this day an élite place in Egyptian society and constitutes one of Egypt's largest families, with well over 15,000 members active in many aspects of society.

Culture 
Historically, the Abazin engaged in animal herding and some farming.

The Abazins are dominantly Sunni Muslims. The Abazins first encountered Islam during their migrations to the Abazinia region via contact with the Nogais and other Muslim peoples. The Abazins adopted Islam via the influence of Muslim merchants and missionaries from the 16th to 19th centuries.

See also
Abaza in Egypt
Abazinia
Abazinsky District

References

 
Russian Muslims
Ethnic groups in Russia
Ethnic groups in Turkey
Ethnic groups in Lebanon
Ethnic groups in Syria
Ethnic groups in Jordan
Ethnic groups in Egypt
Karachay-Cherkessia
Stavropol Krai
Muslim communities of Russia
Peoples of the Caucasus
Muslim communities of the Caucasus